The BMW Jamaica Classic was a golf tournament on the PGA Tour Latinoamérica that was first played in 2017. The tournament is sponsored by event managers and broadcasters SportsMax, and was the first PGA Tour Latinoamérica event held in Jamaica.

History
The inaugural event was held June 15–18, 2017 and took place at the Cinnamon Hill Golf Course in Montego Bay, Jamaica. The event was won by American Jared Wolfe by one stroke over Gerardo Ruiz and José de Jesús Rodríguez.

Winners

Notes

References

External links
Tournament info at PGA Tour Latinoamérica website

PGA Tour Latinoamérica events
Golf tournaments in Jamaica
Recurring sporting events established in 2017
Summer events in Jamaica
2017 establishments in Jamaica